Sung-hyun is a Korean unisex given name, predominantly masculine. Its meaning differs based on the hanja used to write each syllable of the name. There are 27 hanja with the reading "seong" and 35 hanja with the reading "hyun" on the South Korean government's official list of hanja which may be registered for use in given names. Sung-hyun was the fourth-most popular name for baby boys in South Korea in 1990.

People with this name include:

Entertainers
Mowg (composer) (born Lee Sung-hyun, 1972), South Korean male composer
Andrew Choi (Korean name Choi Sung-hyun, born 1980), South Korean male singer
Yoon Sung-hyun (born 1982), South Korean male film director and screenwriter
Eru (singer) (born Jo Sung-hyun, 1983), South Korean male singer
Baek Sung-hyun (born 1989), South Korean male actor
Kevin Woo (Korean name Woo Sung-hyun, born 1991), American male singer based in South Korea

Sportspeople
Choi Sung-hyun (born 1982), South Korean male football midfielder
Park Sung-hyun (born 1983), South Korean female archer
Kim Sung-hyun (baseball, born 1987) (born 1987), South Korean male baseball second baseman
Ko Sung-hyun (born 1987), South Korean male badminton player
Kim Seong-hyun (born 1989), South Korean male baseball pitcher
Kyung Sung-hyun (born 1990), South Korean male alpine skier
Shin Seong-hyun (born 1990), South Korean male baseball infielder
Lee Sung-hyun (born 1991), South Korean male kickboxer
Moon Sung-hyun (baseball) (born 1991), South Korean male baseball pitcher
Kim Sung-hyun (born 1993), South Korean male football defender
Park Sung-hyun (born 1993), South Korean female golfer

Other
Moon Sung-hyun (born 1952), South Korean male politician, founding member of the Democratic Labor Party
JJonak (born Bang Seong-hyun), South Korean male Overwatch player
Sunghyun Cho, South Korean electrical engineer
Andrew Kim (Korean name Kim Sung-hyun), South Korean-born American intelligence officer

See also
List of Korean given names

References

Korean unisex given names